Lezhnevsky District is an administrative and municipal district (raion), one of the twenty-one in Ivanovo Oblast, Russia. It is located in the southwest of the oblast. Its administrative center is the urban locality (a settlement) of Lezhnevo. Population:   20,102 (2002 Census);  The population of Lezhnevo accounts for 47.1% of the district's total population.

References

Notes

Sources

Districts of Ivanovo Oblast